Lovro Benić (born 8 October 1994) is a Croatian footballer who plays for Zavrč in the Slovenian PrvaLiga.

References

External links
PrvaLiga profile 

1994 births
Living people
Footballers from Rijeka
Association football midfielders
Croatian footballers
HNK Rijeka players
NK Pomorac 1921 players
NK Zavrč players
NK Grobničan players
HNK Orijent players
Croatian Football League players
First Football League (Croatia) players
Slovenian PrvaLiga players
Croatian expatriate footballers
Expatriate footballers in Slovenia
Croatian expatriate sportspeople in Slovenia